Silvano Barco (born 5 May 1963) is an Italian cross-country skier who competed from 1985 to 1996. He finished fifth in the 4 × 10 km relay at the 1988 Winter Olympics in Calgary.

Career
His best World Cup finish was second twice, earning them in 1988 and 1991. Barco best finish at the FIS Nordic World Ski Championships was tenth twice in the 15 km event (1989, 1991). Barco earned two individual career victories, both in 1994 Continental Cup events at 15 km.

Cross-country skiing results
All results are sourced from the International Ski Federation (FIS).

Olympic Games

World Championships

World Cup

Season standings

Individual podiums
3 podiums

Team podiums
 1 victory
 3 podiums

References

External links

Olympic 4 x 10 km relay results: 1936-2002 

1963 births
Italian male cross-country skiers
Living people
Cross-country skiers at the 1988 Winter Olympics
Universiade medalists in cross-country skiing
Universiade silver medalists for Italy
Competitors at the 1985 Winter Universiade
Olympic cross-country skiers of Italy
Sportspeople from the Province of Sondrio